Ronn McFarlane (born 1953) is an American lutenist and composer, most notable as an interpreter of Renaissance music.  He formerly taught lute at the Peabody Conservatory, and has recorded many albums as a solo performer and in collaboration with others, including the groups Ayreheart and The Baltimore Consort, and as a guest artist for countless other groups.  He resides in Portland, Oregon, and continues to perform and compose to this day.

Life and career
Ronn McFarlane was born in West Virginia and grew up in Maryland. He began playing guitar as a teenager and went on to play blues and rock music in popular music bands. He studied classical guitar at Shenandoah Conservatory and continued his studies at Peabody Conservatory with Paul O'Dette, Roger Harmon, and Pat O'Brien. In 1978, he began to concentrate on lute, and in 1979 became a founding member of the Baltimore Consort. He began a touring career in the United States, Canada and Europe, both with the Baltimore Consort and as a soloist.

From 1984-1995, he was a faculty member of the Peabody Conservatory teaching lute. In 1996, he received an honorary Doctorate of Music from Shenandoah Conservatory for his achievements as a musician and recording artist. McFarlane began composing music for the lute and working with a new ensemble called Ayreheart. He has also published collections of lute music, including Scottish Lute in 1998 and Highland King: The Scottish Lute in 2003.

Discography
McFarlane made over 25 recordings for the Dorian Recordings label, including solo albums, lute performances, recordings with the Baltimore Consort and other selections. His solo CD Indigo Road, which featured original compositions, received a Grammy Award Nomination for Best Classical Crossover Album in 2009.

Solo
The Art of Vivaldi's Lute, 2011
One Morning, 2009
Indigo Road, 2007
The Art of the Lute, 2003
Highland King, 1999
A Distant Shore, 1997
Between Two Hearts, 1996
The Renaissance Lute, 1994
The Lute Music of John Dowland, 1991
The Scottish Lute, 1990

Collaborations
Fermi's Paradox, with Carloyn Surrick, 2020
Nine Notes that Shook the World with Mindy Rosenfeld, 2013
Two Lutes with William Simms, 2012
Blame Not My Lute with Robert Aubry Davis, 2010
The Italian Lute Song with Julianne Baird, 1996
The English Lute Song with Julianne Baird, 1993
O Mistress Mine with Frederick Urrey, 1986
Greensleeves with Julianne Baird, 1985

With Ayreheart
Barley Moon, 2016

With The Baltimore Consort
Adio Espana: Romances Sonatas & Improvisations, 2009
Bright Day Star, 2009
Live in Concert (live recording), 2008
Gut, Wind and Wire, 2007
Adew Dundee, 2003
Best of the Baltimore Consort (compilation), 2003
Amazing Grace also with Custer LaRue, 2001
The Mad Buckgoat, 1999
The Ladyes Delight, 1998
Tunes from the Attic, 1997
A Trip to Killburn, 1996
A Baltimore Consort Collection, 1996
The True Lover's Farewell also with Custer LaRue, 1995
La Rocque 'N' Roll, 1993
Custer LaRue Sing the Daemon Lover also with Custer LaRue, 1993
The Art of the Bawdy Song, 1993
Watkins Ale, 1992
On the Banks of Helicon, 1990

Works
Selected compositions include:

Chamber works
Sycamore, for lute, flute and bass
Indigo Road, for lute
Cathedral Cave, for lute, flute, bass and percussion
Denali, for lute
Overland, for lute, harp, string quartet, bass and percussion
Pinetops, for lute, cittern and bass
Blue Norther, for lute
Chocolate Factory, for lute and percussion
Rosa, for lute, harmonium, bass and percussion
Uncharted Waters, for lute and bass
Dowland's Goodnight, for lute
Early Christmas Morning, for lute
Gigue, for lute
Thistleheart, for lute, flute and bass
Over the Green Earth, for lute
Augusta, for lute, harp, bass and percussion
A Day in November, for lute and ensemble
Bad Hair Day, for lute, sounds and ensemble
Dakota Days, for lute
Before the Wind, for lute and ensemble
Man of Arms, for lute
On the Heath, for two lutes
Lullaby for Anne, for lute
One Morning, for lute and percussion

Vocal works
Borderland, song
Snapdragon, song
Wolf Summit, song
Union Bridge, song

Choral works
Nocturne, for chorus and lute
Sings in Her Sleep, song

References

External links
Official Website

Ayreheart original homepage

1953 births
Living people
American male classical composers
American classical composers
Musicians from West Virginia
American lutenists
20th-century classical composers
20th-century American composers
20th-century American male musicians